Mee Sum Pastry is a Chinese restaurant with two locations in Seattle in the U.S. state of Washington. The business operates at Pike Place Market and has a cafe in the University District.

Description

Mee Sum Pastry operates in Pike Place Market's Triangle Building. The business serves buns and pastries, including pineapple buns and hom bow (filled with barbecue pork), as well as shumai.

Lonely Planet says, "This little storefront window is famed for its giant hum bao – eminently portable meat- or vegetable-filled steamed buns that make a great snack or small meal. The steamed pork bao is tops."

Thrillist says, "With BBQ pork and supersize potstickers, Mee Sum Pastry is a tried and true institution in the market. It's a no frills, fast moving grab 'n go joint."

Reception
Leonardo David Raymundo and Ryan Lee included Mee Sum Pastry in Eater Seattle 2021 list of "14 Delightful Dim Sum Restaurants in the Seattle Area".

See also 
 History of Chinese Americans in Seattle
 List of Chinese restaurants

References

External links

 
 Mee Sum Pastry at Pike Place Market
 Mee Sum Pastry at Zomato

Chinese restaurants in Seattle
Pike Place Market
University District, Seattle
Central Waterfront, Seattle